Die Fledermaus is a 1962 Austrian  musical film directed by Géza von Cziffra and starring Peter Alexander, Marianne Koch and Marika Rökk. It is an adaptation of the operetta Die Fledermaus by Johann Strauss II, Karl Haffner and Richard Genée.

The film's sets were designed by the art directors Fritz Jüptner-Jonstorff and Alexander Sawczynski.

Cast
 Peter Alexander as Dr. Gabriel Eisenstein 
 Marianne Koch as Rosalinde 
 Marika Rökk as Adele, the Maid 
 Willy Millowitsch as Frank 
 Gunther Philipp as Pista von Bundassy 
 Boy Gobert as Prinz Orlofsky 
 Hans Moser as Frosch the Jailer 
 Oskar Sima as Basil Arabayam 
 Susi Nicoletti as Baroness Martens 
 Rolf Kutschera as Alfred 
 Rudolf Carl as Joseph

References

Bibliography
 Thomas Elsaesser & Michael Wedel. The BFI companion to German cinema. British Film Institute, 1999.

External links

1962 films
1960s historical musical films
Austrian historical musical films
1960s German-language films
Films directed by Géza von Cziffra
Operetta films
Films based on operettas
Films set in the 1890s
Films set in Vienna